François Lepenant (18 July 1893 – 23 January 1984) was a French racing cyclist. He rode in the 1925 Tour de France.

References

1893 births
1984 deaths
French male cyclists
Place of birth missing